The Madhya Pradesh I solar park near Surajpur Village in the Shajapur district of Madhya Pradesh is a 200 megawatt (MWDC) photovoltaic power station, which is under construction. It was formerly known as solar park Northwest India I. 

It is under construction as a fixed tilt mounting structure, using mono PERC solar PV technology. The power plant will be connected to a 400 kV PGCIL Pachora substation. The produced electricity will be taken by 1. M.P. Power Management Company Limited (MPPMCL) and Indian Railways (IR). 

References

External links
 https://www.thomas-lloyd.com/en/portfolio-item/madhya-pradesh-i/

Photovoltaic power stations in India
Shajapur district
Power stations in Madhya Pradesh